In enzymology, a 4-sulfobenzoate 3,4-dioxygenase is an enzyme that catalyzes the chemical reaction

4-sulfobenzoate + NADH + H+ + O2  3,4-dihydroxybenzoate + sulfite + NAD+

The 4 substrates of this enzyme are 4-sulfobenzoate, NADH, H+, and O2, whereas its 3 products are 3,4-dihydroxybenzoate, sulfite, and NAD+.

This enzyme belongs to the family of oxidoreductases, specifically those acting on paired donors, with O2 as oxidant and incorporation or reduction of oxygen. The oxygen incorporated need not be derived from O2 with NADH or NADPH as one donor, and incorporation of two atoms o oxygen into the other donor.  The systematic name of this enzyme class is 4-sulfobenzoate,NADH:oxygen oxidoreductase (3,4-hydroxylating, sulfite-forming). Other names in common use include 4-sulfobenzoate dioxygenase, and 4-sulfobenzoate 3,4-dioxygenase system.  This enzyme participates in 2,4-dichlorobenzoate degradation.  It has 3 cofactors: iron, FMN,  and Iron-sulfur.

References

 

EC 1.14.12
NADPH-dependent enzymes
NADH-dependent enzymes
Iron enzymes
Flavoproteins
Iron-sulfur enzymes
Enzymes of unknown structure